Gary Paddison is a former football (soccer) player who represented New Zealand at international level.

Paddison made a solitary official international starting appearance for New Zealand in a 1–1 draw with Macao on 5 November 1975.
Also made 3 other appearances as substitutes in Wuhan and Jakarta on the 1975 tour as well as against Norwich for NZ in 1979 in Auckland as well as on the reserves (of 13) in 3 other matches.
Represented NZ, NZ Under 21's, Wellington and Auckland
1972 Central League top goalscorer 
1975 National league top goalscorer

References 

1952 births
Living people
Wellington United players
Stop Out players
New Zealand association footballers
New Zealand international footballers
Association footballers not categorized by position